The Minister for Greenland was a ministerial post in the Danish government between 1958 and 1987, and was responsible for affairs related to Greenland. The post was abolished when Greenland received home rule.

Lists of ministers

Sources
Various editions of The Europa World Year Book

Politics of Denmark
Politics of Greenland